The A. E. Cook House is an historic house at 176 Aldrich Street in Uxbridge, Massachusetts.  The construction date of this  story wood frame Cape style house is not known; based on stylistic analysis, it may have been built as early as 1750, making it one of the older homes in South Uxbridge.  All of its facades are asymmetrical in appearance; the main facade has a central door, with two windows on one side, and one on the other.  The house's age is in part given by its massive central chimney.

On October 7, 1983, it was added to the National Register of Historic Places.

See also
National Register of Historic Places listings in Uxbridge, Massachusetts

References

Houses completed in 1800
Houses in Uxbridge, Massachusetts
National Register of Historic Places in Uxbridge, Massachusetts
Houses on the National Register of Historic Places in Worcester County, Massachusetts